Lepotrema hemitaurichthydis is a species of lepocreadiid digenean parasitic in the intestine of marine fish. It was described in 2018.

Hosts and localities

The pyramid butterflyfish, Hemitaurichthys polylepis, (Perciformes: Chaetodontidae), is the type-host of Lepotrema hemitaurichthydis. Another host is the Thompson's butterflyfish Hemitaurichthys thompsoni. The type-locality is off Palau; other localities are off Tubuai, off Rimatara, Austral Islands, French Polynesia, and off Fatu Hiva, Marquesas, French Polynesia.

References 

Plagiorchiida
Animals described in 2018
Fauna of Palau
Fauna of French Polynesia
Parasites of fish